Pipimorpha is an unranked clade containing all frogs which are more closely related to living Pipidae species than to living Rhinophrynus species. Members of this group are highly adapted to aquatic life. The oldest pipimorphs are Neusibatrachus and Gracilibatrachus from the Early Cretaceous of Spain, with other records of the group known from Afro-Arabia and South America like modern Pipidae. The extinct family Palaeobatrachidae, particularly the genus Palaeobatrachus were widespread and abundant in Europe during the Cenozoic, until their extinction during the Middle Pleistocene around 500,000 years ago due to being unable to cope with the increasing aridity and freezing temperatures of the ice ages.

Taxonomy 
Genera are monotypic unless otherwise noted

Taxonomy after A. M. Aranciaga Rolando et al. 2019

 †Neusibatrachus Seiffert 1972 La Pedrera de Rúbies Formation, Spain, Early Cretaceous (Barremian)
 †Gracilibatrachus Baez 2013 Las Hoyas, Spain, Early Cretaceous (Barremian)
 †Nevobatrachus Mahony, 2019 (=Cordicephalus Nevo, 1968) Hatira Formation, Israel, Lower Cretaceous
 †Thoraciliacus Nevo 1968 Hatira Formation, Israel, Lower Cretaceous
 †Avitabatrachus Báez, Trueb & Calvo, 2000 Candeleros Formation, Late Cretaceous (Cenomanian)
 †Vulcanobatrachus Trueb et al. 2005 South Africa, Late Cretaceous
 †Cratopipa Carvalho et al., 2019 Crato Formation, Brazil, Early Cretaceous (Aptian)
 †Palaeobatrachidae Europe, Late Cretaceous-Middle Pleistocene
 †Palaeobatrachus Tschudi, 1838 (13+ species) Europe, Middle Eocene-Middle Pleistocene
 †Albionbatrachus Meszoely, Špinar et Ford, 1984 (2 species) Europe, Eocene-Miocene
 Clade Panpipidae Aranciaga Rolando et al. 2019
 †Clade Shelaniinae Aranciaga Rolando et al. 2019
 †Patagopipa Aranciaga Rolando et al. 2019 Huitrera Formation, Argentina, Eocene
 †Kuruleufenia Gómez 2016  Allen Formation, Argentina, Late Cretaceous (Campanian-Maastrichtian)
 †Saltenia Reig 1959 Las Curtiembres Formation, Argentina, Late Cretaceous (Campanian)
 †Shelania Casamiquela 1960 Laguna del Hunco Formation, Argentina, Eocene
 Pipidae Gray 1825 Africa, South America, Late Cretaceous (Cenomanian) - Present

References

Mesobatrachia